The Beihai Tunnel is a tunnel in Banli Village, Beigan Township, Lienchiang County, Taiwan.

History
The tunnel was created in 1968 for amphibious landing, 10 years after the end of the Second Taiwan Strait Crisis between the Republic of China Armed Forces and the People's Liberation Army. The construction lasted for around 3 years and claimed the lives of over 100 soldiers. After the Matsu National Scenic Area Administration was established, it took over the management of the tunnel. It renovated the interior of the tunnel and neighboring tourist spots, building an access road and protective railings.

Features
The tunnel is 550 meters long and 9–15 meters wide. Visitors were once able to ride canoe along the tunnel but for several years the site has been closed to visitors due to falling rocks rendering it dangerous.

See also
 List of tourist attractions in Taiwan
 Beihai Tunnel (Dongyin)
 Beihai Tunnel (Nangan)

References

1968 establishments in Taiwan
Beigan Township
Military history of Taiwan
Tunnels completed in 1968
Tunnels in Lienchiang County
Tunnel warfare